The 2008–09 South Carolina men's basketball team represents University of South Carolina. The head coach is Darrin Horn who is in his first season with the Gamecocks. The team plays its home games in the 18,000-seat Colonial Life Arena in Columbia, South Carolina.

Regular season
On November 14, 2008, Carolina defeated the Jacksonville State Gamecocks 89–76 to win the first game of the Darrin Horn Era at USC.

On December 2, 2008, Carolina defeated Princeton 84–58, handing the Tigers their worst defeat in Jadwin Gym since it opened in 1969.

On January 2, 2009, Carolina defeated #19 Baylor, 85–84.

On January 21, 2009, Carolina defeated #24 Florida, 70–69.

On January 31, 2009, Carolina defeated #24 Kentucky, 78–77, the Gamecocks' second win in history at Rupp Arena.

On February 25, 2009, Carolina defeated Kentucky 77–59, setting a school-record for blocked shots with 16, and sweeping the season series with the Wildcats for only the second time (1997) since joining the SEC.

Roster

2009 Commitments

Schedule and results

|-
!colspan=9| Regular season

|-
!colspan=9| Postseason

Awards

SEC Post-Season Awards
Devan Downey – First Team All-SEC, All-Defensive Team
Dominique Archie – Second Team All-SEC, All-Defensive Team
Zam Fredrick, Jr. – Second Team All-SEC
Brandis Raley-Ross – Sixth Man of the Year

SEC Pre-Season Awards
Devan Downey – First Team All-SEC
Dominique Archie – Second Team All-SEC

SEC Player of the Week
Devan Downey – February 2, 2009

References

South Carolina
South Carolina
South Carolina Gamecocks men's basketball seasons
South Carolina Gamecocks men's basketball
South Carolina Gamecocks men's basketball